Emarginachelys cretacea is a turtle belonging to the group Cryptodira, known from well preserved fossils from the Maastrichtian stage of the Late Cretaceous of Montana. Its exact phylogenetic position within Cryptodira is uncertain; different authors considered it to be either the earliest described chelydrid or a fossil relative of kinosternoids.

References

Cryptodira
Prehistoric turtle genera
Late Cretaceous turtles of North America
Hell Creek fauna
Fossil taxa described in 1978